The 1918 U.S. National Championships (now known as the US Open) was a tennis tournament that took place on the outdoor grass courts at the West Side Tennis Club, Forest Hills in New York City, United States. The women's tournament was held from 17 Jun until 22 June while the men's tournament ran from 26 August until 3 September. It was the 38th staging of the U.S. National Championships and due to World War I the only Grand Slam tennis event of the year.

Finals

Men's singles

 Robert Lindley Murray defeated  Bill Tilden  6–3, 6–1, 7–5

Women's singles

 Molla Bjurstedt defeated  Eleanor Goss  6–4, 6–3

Men's doubles
 Bill Tilden /  Vincent Richards defeated  Fred Alexander /  Beals Wright 6–3, 6–4, 3–6, 2–6, 6–4

Women's doubles
 Marion Zinderstein /  Eleonora Sears defeated  Molla Bjurstedt /  Mrs. Rogge 7–5, 8–6

Mixed doubles
 Hazel Wightman /  Irving Wright defeated  Molla Bjurstedt /  Fred Alexander 6–2, 6–4

References

External links
Official US Open website

 
U.S. National Championships
U.S. National Championships (tennis) by year
U.S. National Championships (tennis)
U.S. National Championships (tennis)
U.S. National Championships (tennis)
U.S. National Championships (tennis)
U.S. National Championships (tennis)